is a train station located in Fushimi-ku, Kyoto, Kyoto Prefecture, Japan.

Line
Keihan Electric Railway Keihan Main Line

Layout
Before moving the westbound platform, there were a side platform and an island platform with 3 tracks. The westbound platform was elevated on September 12, 2009, with the eastbound platform following on May 28, 2011, to make it useful for passengers going to Kyoto Racecourse, and there became 2 island platforms serving 4 tracks on March 16, 2013.

Surroundings
The Kyoto Racecourse is located within a distance of short walk from Yodo Station.

Adjacent stations

References

Railway stations in Kyoto
Railway stations in Japan opened in 1910